Yavia cryptocarpa is a species of cactus (family Cactaceae) and the only species of the newly discovered genus Yavia. The genus is named after Argentina's department Yavi, Jujuy Province, where the plant is endemic to sparsely vegetated rocky slopes.  The plant is also sometimes put in the tribe Trichocereeae.
The specific epithet cryptocarpa refers to the plant being a cryptocarp. This means that the fruits are formed inside the plant's body, thus being only visible when the plant shrinks in the drought period.

References

External links
Cacti Guide.com:  photos
Yavia cryptocarpa habitat pictures

Cactoideae
Cactoideae genera
Cacti of South America
Endemic flora of Argentina
Monotypic Cactaceae genera